Amalgaviridae is a family of double-stranded RNA viruses. Member viruses infect plants and are transmitted vertically via seeds. The name derives from amalgam (blend, mix) which refers to amalgaviruses possessing characteristics of both partitiviruses and totiviruses. There are ten species in the family.

Genome 
Amalgavirus genomes are monopartite and about 3.5 kilobases in length. They have two partially overlapping open reading frames which encode the RNA-dependent RNA polymerase (RdRp) and a putative capsid protein.

Evolution 
It has been suggested that amalgaviruses have evolved via recombination between viruses with double-stranded and negative-strand RNA genomes. Phylogenetic analysis indicates that the amalgavirus RdRp forms a sister clade to the corresponding RdRp protein of partitiviruses (Partitiviridae) which have segmented (bipartite) dsRNA genomes and infect plants, fungi and protists. By contrast, the putative capsid protein of amalgaviruses is homologous to the nucleocapsid proteins of negative-strand RNA viruses of the genera Phlebovirus (Bunyaviridae) and Tenuivirus.

Taxonomy
The family Amalgaviridae has two genera and ten species:

Amalgavirus
 Allium cepa amalgavirus 1
 Allium cepa amalgavirus 2
 Blueberry latent virus
 Rhododendron virus A
 Southern tomato virus
 Spinach amalgavirus 1
 Vicia cryptic virus M
 Zoostera marina amalgavirus 1
 Zoostera marina amalgavirus 2
Zybavirus
 ''Zygosaccharomyces bailii virus Z''

References

Double-stranded RNA viruses
Riboviria
Virus families